Sally McKenzie (born 8 February 1955) also credited as Sally MacKenzie, is an Australian actress, director, playwright and screenwriter. She graduated from Australia's prestigious National Institute of Dramatic Art in 1977. She later earned a Master of Fine Arts from the Queensland University of Technology.

Career

Theatre
As a theatre actor, McKenzie has appeared in leading and ensemble roles for the Belvoir St Theatre, Griffin Theatre Company, La Boite Theatre Company, Malthouse Theatre, Melbourne Theatre Company, Nimrod Theatre Company, Playbox Theatre Company, Queensland Theatre Company, The Stables, State Theatre Company of South Australia, Sydney Theatre Company, Q Theatre, Queensland Performing Arts Centre and the T.N! Theatre Company. Stage performances for the Melbourne Theatre Company include title roles in Mourning Becomes Electra by Eugene O’Neill and The Good Woman of Szechwan by Bertolt Brecht. McKenzie has appeared in over 20 productions for the Queensland Theatre Company including lead roles in Macbeth, Night and Day by Tom Stoppard and by David Williamson Top Silk and A Conversation.

TV and film

Screen performances in TV series include Mystic Marj in Mortified, Ms Cunningham in The Wayne Manifesto, Esme in Carson’s Law, Rosetta in Special Squad, Patsy Goldfisch in The Flying Doctors, Grace in A Country Practice and Roo Morgan in episodes 666 and 667 of Prisoner. She played Bertha Schippan in The Schippan Mystery and won Best Single Performance by an Actress in a Serial in the Penguin Awards as rape victim Lynne in a 2-hour special of Cop Shop.

Feature film performances include Gail in With Love From The Person Next To Me, Carrie in We of the Never Never, Carol in Storage, Roz in Jucy and Warden Zelda in Redheads.

Playwright
As a playwright plays include Martha’s War on War, i dot luv dot u☺, A Safer Place, episodes and Scattered Lives. As a screenwriter McKenzie won the highest writing accolade awarded in Australia for performance writing, an Australian Writers' Guild AWGIE Award for Best Documentary Public Broadcast in 2014. As a writer-director films include shorts Shopping For Baby and Death By Art and the 2008 documentary Acting Class of 1977 AKA actingclassof1977.com about her experiences at the National Institute of Dramatic Art and her classmates, who included Mel Gibson.

Filmography

External links

 theCoalface Official Website

References

Living people
National Institute of Dramatic Art alumni
20th-century Australian actresses
21st-century Australian actresses
21st-century Australian dramatists and playwrights
Australian television actresses
Australian stage actresses
Australian women dramatists and playwrights
21st-century Australian women writers
1955 births